State Route 102 (SR 102) is a  state highway in the east-central part of the U.S. state of Georgia. The highway travels from Warthen northeast through Mitchell, east through Gibson, southeast to Avera, and arcing east to Wrens.

Route description
SR 102 begins at an intersection with SR 15 in Warthen, in the north-central part of Washington County. The highway travels to the northeast, and crosses the Ogeechee River into Glascock County, before intersecting SR 123 (Mitchell–Shoals–Jewell Road) in Mitchell. Beginning with a short northeast portion, the highway turns east to an intersection with SR 171 in Gibson. The two highways have a one-block concurrency. SR 102 heads east, and, then, southeast to enter Jefferson County and then the town of Avera. It arcs to Stapleton, where it intersects SR 296. The two highways have a one-block concurrency. Finally, it arcs to its eastern terminus in Wrens, at an intersection with SR 17 (Thomson Road) and SR 80 (Stapleton Highway).

SR 102 is not part of the National Highway System, a system of roadways important to the nation's economy, defense, and mobility.

History

Major intersections

See also

References

External links

102
Transportation in Washington County, Georgia
Transportation in Glascock County, Georgia
Transportation in Jefferson County, Georgia